The Chairman of the Uttar Pradesh Legislative Council presides over the proceedings of the Uttar Pradesh Legislative Council  in the absence of the deputy Chairman of the Uttar Pradesh Legislative Council. The Chairman is elected internally by the Uttar Pradesh Legislative Council.

Eligibility
Chairman of the Uttar Pradesh Legislative Council must:

 Be a citizen of India.;
 Be at least 25 years of age; and
 Should not hold any office of profit under the Government of Uttar Pradesh.

List of The Chairman
The Council is headed by a chairperson, elected by members in a simple majority vote. The following is the list of Chairpersons of the Council.

References

Lists of Indian politicians
Uttar Pradesh Legislative Council